Artists whose work has been produced by the Warner Music Group include:

A 
Aaron Kwok - Hong Kong, China (1990-1995, moved to Philips Records from 1996 to 1999)
Aaliyah (1996, via Atlantic Records)
AB'S
ABBA (via Atlantic Records during US release of Waterloo)
AC/DC
Action Bronson
Adam Faith
Adam Lambert
Adia Victoria
Adina Howard
aespa (Outside South Korea)
Afrojack
Ailee
Aimee Mayo
Airbourne
Against the Current
Agallah
The Agonist
A-ha
Alec Benjamin 
Akon
Alesana
Alestorm
Alex Dezen
Alex Gaskarth
Alex Metric
Alex Newell
Alexander Armstrong
Aleyna Tilki
Alice in Chains (Outside U.S. territories)
Alison Balsom
Alison Sudol (Warner/Chappell Music)
Alissa White-Gluz
All Saints
All Time Low
All-4-One
Allison Moorer (Rykodisc and Warner/Chappell Music)
Alok
Alphabeat
Alphaville
Alt-J
Alter Bridge
Amanda Palmer
Amelia Lily
The Amity Affliction
Amon Amarth (Outside U.S. territories, via Metal Blade Records)
Anderson East
Annabel Jones
Andra Day
Andrea Daly (Warner/Chappell Music)
Androp
Anitta
Anne-Marie
Annie Moses Band
Annihilator
Anthrax
The Apples in Stereo
Arcadia
Architects (US, via Epitaph Records)
Arctic Monkeys
Art of Dying
Art Garfunkel
Artemis Quartet
Arthur McArthur
Ashley Monroe
Ashnikko
Atkins
Atlantic Starr
Atlas Genius
Atreyu
Auburn
Aubrie Sellers
Audra Mae
Aura Dione (Since 2019 with the Single Shania Twain)
Aurora Orchestra
Auryn
Ayaka

B 
B1A4
Baby Chaos
Babyshambles
Badfinger
Bad Company
Bad Religion
Frankie Ballard
Gnarls Barkley
Basshunter (Sweden)
Bat for Lashes
Baton Rouge
Battlecross (Outside U.S. territories, via Metal Blade Records)
Bazzi
Bebe Rexha
Becky Hill
Bee Gees
Behemoth (Outside U.S. territories, via Metal Blade Records)
Bellefire
Belly
Belinda Carlisle (Rykodisc)
Belouis Some
Bernard Cribbins
Beverley Knight
Ben Lee
Bette Midler
Beyoncé (Warner/Chappell Music)
Big Ali
BIGBANG
Big & Rich
Billie Joe Armstrong
Billy J. Kramer
Billy Lawrence
Birdy
Björk
The Black Dahlia Murder (Outside U.S. territories, via Metal Blade Records)
The Black Keys
Black Label Society
Blake Shelton
Blas Cantó
Blazin' Squad
Blind Guardian (Europe, via Nuclear Blast/BMG Rights Management)
Bliss
Blonde
Blur
B.o.B
Bob Sinclar
Bobby Lewis
Bobby Tench
Bolt Thrower (Outside U.S. territories, via Metal Blade Records)
Boyzone
Haley Bonar
Bonnie Lou
Brian Imanuel Soewarno
Brendon Urie
Brett Eldredge
The Brilliant Green
Bruce Dickinson
Bruno Mars
Bruno & Marrone (1995-1998)
Brynn Cartelli
Michael Bublé
Biffy Clyro
Built to Spill
Busted
Burna boy

C 
Candlebox
Candlemass
Cane Hill
Cannibal Corpse (Outside U.S. territories, via Metal Blade Records)
Carabao
Cardi B (Atlantic Records)
Carly Simon
Cascada
Cash Cash
Cavalera Conspiracy
Cedric Gervais
CeeLo Green
Carabao (Warner Music Thailand)
Cosculluela
The Corrs (Atlantic Records)
Johnny Cash
Charice
Charles Aznavour
Charlie Puth
Charlie Worsham
Cheap Trick
Cheat Codes
Chelsea Grin
The Chemical Brothers
Cher
Cherish (2003-2006)
Chester Bennington
Cherry Bullet 
Chicos de Barrio
Chiddy Bang
Chimaira
Chisato Moritaka
Chisu
Choi Jun-hee
Chris Bell
Chrissy Costanza
Christina and Michelle Naughton
Christina Perri (Atlantic Records)
Christine and the Queens
Christopher Cross
Chromeo
Chevelle
Cilla Black
Clean Bandit
Cleopatra
Cliff Bennett and the Rebel Rousers
CN Blue
Coal Chamber
Cobra Starship
Code Orange
Cody Simpson
Phil Collins
Coolio
The Corrs
Cowboy Troy
Chicago
The Cars
Coal Chamber
Coldplay (2013–present)
Coldrain
Conor Maynard
Corey Taylor
Cradle of Filth
Craig David
Crazy Frog (Sweden)
Creamy
Crystal Fighters
Charli XCX
Pakho Chau

D 

D-Side
Diamond Platnumz
Dan Wilson
Daniel Lanois
Danity Kane (Bad Boy/Atlantic)
Daft Punk (Parlophone)
Damon Albarn
Darius Rucker
The Darkness
Daughtry
Dave Mustaine (Via Megadeth)
Dave Wong - Republic of China (1987-1995, now moved to Philips Record from 1996 to 1998)
David Bowie
Craig David
David Cook (Warner/Chappell Music)
David Draiman (Via Disturbed)
David Guetta (2013–present)
Sammy Davis Jr.
Dawn of Ashes
Day26
DAY6
Dean Martin
Death
Death Angel (Europe, via Nuclear Blast/BMG Rights Management)
Death Cab for Cutie
Debi Nova
Debbie Harry
Deftones
Delain
Jason Derülo
Device
The Devil Wears Prada
DevilDriver
Devo
Dez Fafara (Via DevilDriver)
Diddy
Diljit Dosanjh
Dio
Dire Straits
Disturbed
Alesha Dixon
DJ Drama
Dokken
The Donnas
The Doobie Brothers
The Doors
Double You
Down
DragonForce
Drake Bell
DRAM (Empire/Atlantic)
Dr. Dre (Warner/Chappell Music)
Dream Theater
Drew Parker (Warner Music Nashville)
Dua Lipa
Dwight Yoakam

E 

E-40
Eagles
Echosmith
Édith Piaf
Ed Motta (1990-1996)
Ed Sheeran
Edis
Eiffel 65
Eight Seconds
Eisley
Elbow (Warner/Chappell Music)
Brett Eldredge
Electric Boys
Eliza Doolittle
Ella Eyre
Ella Henderson
Elliot Moss (Warner/Chappell Music)
Elsa Lunghini
Elsten Torres
EMF
Enuff Z'Nuff
Enya
Epica (Europe, via Nuclear Blast/BMG Rights Management)
The Everly Brothers
Erena Ono
Eric Clapton
Eskimo Joe
Evermore
Everything
Exodus (Europe, via Nuclear Blast/MBG Rights Management)

F 

Fabolous
Faith No More
Faster Pussycat
Fat Joe
Fat Trel
Fatboy Slim
Fats Domino
Fay Ray
Fear, and Loathing in Las Vegas
Felip
Fetty Wap
Lupe Fiasco
F.I.R.
Filippa Giordano
Flaming Lips
Flanders & Swann
Fleetwood Mac
Flotsam and Jetsam
Florent Mothe
Flo Rida
Khalil Fong
Fort Minor
The Fourmost
Frankie Ballard
The Four Seasons
Aretha Franklin
Stan Freberg
Freezepop
Frente!
Frightened Rabbit
Foreigner
Foy Vance
Front Line Assembly
Funeral for a Friend
Fear Factory
F.T. Island
Fun.

G 

Gabrielle Aplin
Galneryus
Garbage
Gary Private
Gass
Genesis
George
Georgi Kay
The Georgia Satellites
Gerard Way
Gesaffelstein
Jimmie Dale Gilmore
Glassjaw
Glenn Frey
Gloriana
Gojira
Goldfrapp
Goo Goo Dolls
The Good Natured
The Good, the Bad & the Queen
Gorilla Zoe
Gorillaz
Got7
Graham Coxon
Amy Grant
The Grateful Dead
David Gray
Green Day
Nanci Griffith
Josh Groban
Guan Zhe
Gucci Mane
Guilherme Arantes
Günther & The Sunshine Girls (Sweden)
Gwar (Outside U.S. and territories, via Metal Blade Records)
Gyllene Tider
Gym Class Heroes
Gyroscope
eazy-G

H 
HammerFall
Hale
Halestorm
Hatebreed
Hayley Williams (Via Paramore)
Jam Hsiao
Bill Haley and His Comets
Johnny Hallyday (Warner Music France, 2006–present)
Hard-Fi
Heaven & Hell
Helloween (Europe, via Nuclear Blast/BMG Rights Management)
Sara Hickman
Faith Hill
Paris Hilton
Ryoko Hirosue
HIM
Home and Away
Hoodoo Gurus
Hootie and the Blowfish
The Housemartins
Huang Zitao (Huang Z.TAO Studio/L.TAO Entertainment)
Hunter Hayes
Vivian Hsu

I 
Ill Niño
In Flames<reIn This Moment
Ilya
Natalie Imbruglia
Indah Nevertari (Indonesia)
Inner Circle
James Ingram
Irene Cara
Iron & Wine
Iron Maiden
INNA
 Isabella Castillo
 The Isley Brothers
IU
IV of Spades

J 
Jack Ü (Mad Decent/Owsla)
Jake Miller
Jamie
James Hype
Janelle Monáe
Janice Vidal
Jasmine Guy
Jasmine Thompson
Jason Mraz
Jason Newsted
Jay-Z (Warner/Chappell Music)
JJ Lin
Jolin Tsai (2009-2018)
Jesse & Joy
Jin Akanishi
JYJ
JLS
Jack's Mannequin
Colin James
Etta James
Jane's Addiction
Jean-Michel Jarre
Ben Jelen
Jemaine Clement
Katherine Jenkins
Jenny Lewis
Jess Glynne
Jess Lee
Jess Mills
Jesse Leach (Via Killswitch Engage) 
Jet
Jethro Tull
Jewel
Jill Scott
Jill Vidal
Jimi Hendrix
The Jimi Hendrix Experience
Jimmy Eat World
John Butler Trio
John Lennon
John Linnell
John Michael Montgomery
JoJo
Joji
Jonathan Davis
Howard Jones
Mike Jones
Quincy Jones
Spike Jones
Jools Holland
Jeremy Jordan
William Joseph
Josh Groban
Joshua Ledet
Joyce DiDonato
Joyspeed (1994-1996)
JR JR
Judy Henske
Julia Michaels (Warner/Chappell Music)
Julien-K
Junior Prom
Junior Senior
Justice
Justin Tranter
Justine Skye

K 
K.C. & the Sunshine Band
Kacey Musgraves (Warner/Chappell Music)
Kamelot
Kansiik
Kate Earl (Record Collection/Warner Bros.)
Kate Nash (Warner/Chappell Music)
Katy Tiz
Kirko Bangz
Wiz Khalifa
Kehlani
Keith Ape
Kelly Clarkson
Kelly Key (2001-2007, 2019–present)
Kenji Wu
Kevin Gates
Kep1er
Chaka Khan
Kid Abelha (1981-2000)
Kid Rock
Kiiara
Rilo Kiley
Kill Hannah
Killswitch Engage
Kimbra
Kim Carnes
Kim Wilde
Ben E. King
King Diamond
The Kinks
Kodak Black (Dollaz N Dealz/Sniper Gang/Atlantic)
Jocie Kok
Korn
Kotak (Indonesia)
Kraftwerk
Jana Kramer
Krisko
Kwabs
Talib Kweli
Aaron Kwok
Khalil Fong
Kyary Pamyu Pamyu
Kyle (Indie-Pop/Atlantic)
Kylie Minogue
Kyuss
Jo$eph kargbo
Kay Trần

L 
Larry June
Laura Izibor
Laura Pausini
Lauriana Mae
Lakuna
Lamb of God
Larry the Cable Guy
LaViVe
Lazy Mutha Fucka (Warner Music Hong Kong, Taiwan)
Leanne & Naara
Led Zeppelin
Coco Lee
Lee Hazlewood
Leigh-Anne Pinnock
Jacquie Lee
Tom Lehrer
Leon Bolier
Leslie Grace (Warner/Chappell Music)
Donna Lewis
Huey Lewis and the News
Lewis Watson
Kelvin Tan Wei Lian
Li Ronghao
Life of Agony
Lifehouse
Lights
Lil Durk
Lil Uzi Vert (Generation Now/Atlantic)
Lily Allen
Linda Thompson
Linkin Park
Little Boots
The Living End
Lola Amour
London Boys
London Grammar
Loona
Loreen
Lorraine Ellison
Loso Brim (Sleep Is For The Rich/EMPIRE)
Los Lobos
Los Prisioneros
Lostprophets
Luis Miguel (Singer)
Luttenberger*Klug
L.V.
Lvndscape
Lykke Li
Lynyrd Skynyrd
Lukas Graham
Lulu Santos
Luciano Ligabue
Ludmilla
Lupe Fiasco
Lim Hyung Joo
Shiga Lin
Lzzy Hale (Via Halestorm)
 Lazzy jazz

M 
Timo Maas (non-USA)
M2M
Machine Head
Macklemore & Ryan Lewis
Madilyn Bailey
Madina Lake
Madonna (1982-2010)(2020-onwards)
The Magician
The Maine
Maite Perroni
Manowar
Maraaya
Marcelo Falcão
Marco Carta
Marina and the Diamonds
Mark Ronson (2003-2007)
Marshmello (Via Spinnin' Records)
Mastodon
Matt Duke
Matt Heafy
Matt Stone
Maximum the Hormone
Miriam Makeba
Jessi Malay
Maná
Teairra Marí
Ziggy Marley
Dean Martin
Matchbox Twenty
MC Cheung (2021-)
MC Davo
MC Solaar
Travis McCoy
Michael McDonald
Sarah McLachlan
Meese
Meg & Dia
Megadeth
Melanie Martinez
The Men They Couldn't Hang
Sérgio Mendes
Idina Menzel
Natalie Merchant
Mercyful Fate
Meshuggah (Europe, via Nuclear Blast/BMG Rights Management)
Metallica
Lucia Micarelli
Michelle Branch
Michael Bublé
Michael Sembello
Michael Learns To Rock
Migos
Luis Miguel
Milton Nascimento
Ministry
Dannii Minogue
Joni Mitchell
Mike Shinoda
Misfits
Missy Elliott
Molly Sandén
Moby
Mogwai
Monkees, The
Monrose
Heidi Montag
Morrissey
Van Morrison
Motionless in White
Mötley Crüe
Motörhead
Mott the Hoople
Mr. President
Muse
Mutiny Within
Mutemath
My Chemical Romance
Fiona Sit
Christophe Maé
Mystery Skulls
Maggie Lindemann (300 Entertainment)
Miriam Yeung

N 
Naff
Akina Nakamori
Needtobreathe
Nek
Nevershoutnever
New York Dolls
New Order
Ney Matogrosso
Nickelback
Nico & Vinz
Nicole Zefanya
Nicolette Larson
Stevie Nicks
Nigel Kennedy
Nightwish
Nikhil D'Souza
Nina Simone
Nina Sky
Nine Inch Nails
Nitty Gritty Dirt Band
Nyne Milli
The Notorious B.I.G.

O 
One Day Alive
O.T. Genasis
John Oates
Obituary
Mariana Ochoa
The Offspring (1984-1994)
Of Mice & Men
Ofra Haza
Oingo Boingo
The O'Jays
Ol' Dirty Bastard
Olivia Chaney
Silvia Olari
Renee Olstead
Omarion
One Ok Rock
Only The Young
Opeth
Rita Ora
Natalia Oreiro
O Rappa
Orgy
Otep
Robyn Ottolini
Our Lady Peace
Overkill
Owsley

P 
Pablo Alboran
Panic! at the Disco
Paramore
Parkway Drive
Pantera
Sean Paul
Laura Pausini
Toni Pearen
Teddy Pendergrass
Pendulum
Pennywise
Periphery (Sumerian Records)
Peter Bjorn and John
Peter, Paul & Mary
Pet Shop Boys (Parlophone) (return 2017–present catalogue: 1985–2012) (Europe And Rest Of World)
Phil Anselmo
Phil Collins
Phineas and Ferb Soundtrack (only in Singapore and Malaysia)
Phish
Piso 21
P1Harmony
Pixies
Plan B
Plastic Bertrand
Plies
Pongsit Kamphee
P.O.D.
The Pogues
Porcupine Tree
Portugal. The Man
Daniel Powter
The Pretenders
Prince
Prince Paul
The Proclaimers (Parlophone/Chrysalis)
The Prodigy
PVRIS
Paulo Londra

Q 

Queen
Queensberry
Queensrÿche
Quest

R 

Ramones (Sire Records)
Rancid
Ratt
RBD
RED
R.E.M.
Leon Redbone
RedOne
Red Hot Chili Peppers (since 1991)
Regina Spektor
Residual Kid
Rhiannon Giddens
Damien Rice
Rita Ora
Ritchie Valens
Richard, Cliff
Rob Thomas
Robert Plant
Roberta Flack (until 1996)
Roberto Frejat
Robin Beck (East West Germany, 1994)
Robin Schulz
Rohff
Ronnie James Dio
Roxette
Linda Ronstadt
Rush
Tom Rush
Patrice Rushen
Ruslana
Rod Stewart
Rockers Hi-Fi
Roy Woods
Rudimental
Serena Ryder

S 
Saara Aalto
Sally Barker
Signmark
David Sanborn
Adam Sandler
Hope Sandoval
Véronique Sanson
Savage Garden
Alejandro Sanz
Sarah Brightman
Satyricon (Roadrunner Records UK)
Peter Schilling
Scorpions
Seal
Dan Seals
Secondhand Serenade
Secos & Molhados
Sepultura
Serj Tankian
Sevendust
The Sex Pistols
SF9
Serebro (Indonesian Only)
Shadows Fall
The Shadows
Shane Filan
Shane Richie
Shadmehr Aghili
Ed Sheeran
Shifty
Shimmy Smoovee (also known as Shimmy Rock, now goes by Shimmy AP)
Shinedown
Shila Amzah
Shy'm
Shutter Boy
Sia (2017–present)
Sick of it All
Silversun Pickups
Simply Red
Carly Simon
Paul Simon
Nina Simone
Simple Plan
Frank Sinatra
Nancy Sinatra
Sirenia
The Sisters of Mercy
Fiona Sit
Sixpence None the Richer
Skid Row
Skindred
Skillet
Skrillex
Slash
Slayer
Sleeping with Sirens
The Slip
Slipknot
The Smashing Pumpkins
Smile.dk
The Smiths
Molly Smitten-Downes
Phoebe Snow
Soul Coughing (Slash/Tommy Boy/Warner Bros.)
Soulfly
The Sounds
Spandau Ballet (Chrysalis/Parlophone)
Staind
Jeffree Star (part of Independent Label Group/Warner Music's Popsicle Records)
Starship (Rhino Entertainment)
Static-X
Candi Staton
Stephane Legar (Warner Music France, 2020–present)
Stereolab
Al Stewart
Dave Stewart
Rod Stewart
Stone Sour
Stone Temple Pilots
The Stooges
Stooshe
Story of the Year
The Sugarcubes
Sugar Ray
Sum 41 (Hopeless Records, via ADA)
The Sundance Kids
Stefanie Sun (Sun Yanzi)
Gene Summers
Supergrass
Superfly
Keith Sweat
Sweetbox
Sweetwater
Switchfoot (distribution only; Signed by lowercase people records)
Sofia Reyes

T 
T Bone Burnett
Taffy
Taking Back Sunday
Taking Dawn
The Mills
The Roop
Tangerine Dream
Tangier
Tanita Tikaram
Tank
James Taylor
Team Spirit
Team Syachihoko
Tears for Fears
Teddybears
Teitur
Tegan and Sara
Teresa Sterne
Teresa Stratas
Testament
TGT
Theory of a Deadman
Theophilus London
The Knocks
The Roop
They Might Be Giants
Third Eye Blind
Thom Sonny Green
T.I.
Tia Ray
Tiësto
Tigran Hamasyan
Tigresa del Oriente
Tim Buckley
Times of Grace
Timo Andres
Tinie Tempah 
Ashley Tisdale
TISM (in Australia for re-releases only)
Titãs
Tommy Torres
Tom Dundee (Thai singer)
Tom Petty
Tom Petty and the Heartbreakers
Tones and I (Bad Batch/Elektra)
Tom Tom Club
Tori Amo. s (1992 - 2001, via Atlantic)
Toru Takemitsu
Tove Lo (Warner/Chappell Music)
Tracy Chapman
Trapt
Trespassers William
Trey Parker
Trivium
Trillville
True Tides
Tucker Beathard
Tunde Adebimpe
Twice
Twista
Twisted Sister
Twenty One Pilots
TAL
Ty Dolla Sign
Tyondai Braxton
Type O Negative
THE OLDSHOOL POEYTRY

U 

Christopher Uckermann
The Used
Ugly God

V 

Valient Thorr
Vangelis
Van Halen
Vanilla Ice
Jenni Vartiainen
VersaEmerge
Versailles
The Velvet Underground
The Veronicas
VideoKids
Maija Vilkkumaa
Violent Femmes
Visions of Atlantis
Vixen (U.S. via CMC Intl.; UK via Sanctuary)
Vũ

W 

Tom Waits
Waka Flocka Flame
Whirl Eye (Vevo/Warner Music)
Paul Wall
Wallows
Grover Washington Jr.
We as Human
Ween
Westernhagen
Weezer
White Lion
Wiley
John Williams
Mason Williams
Winger
Within Temptation
Why Don't We
Wordsworth

X, Y, Z, #0-100 

X
X Japan (Warner Music Japan)
Xandria
Charli XCX
X.V.
Rachael Yamagata
Peter Yarrow
Yellowcard
Yellow Claw (Via Spinnin' Records)
Yellow Magic Orchestra
Yngwie Malmsteen
Yo-Yo
Yolanda Be Cool
Young the Giant
Young Thug
Ylvis
Yui Aragaki
Yui Asaka
Sami Yusuf
Yung Joc
Dwight Yoakam
Warren Zevon
Zay Hilfigerrr
Zahara (Warner Music South Africa) 
Zélia Duncan (1994-1998, 2012)
Zion & Lennox
Zayion McCall
ZZ Top
Tomohisa Yamashita
Yazz
Zakk Wylde
Zaeden
1st.One
3OH!3
5 Seconds Of Summer

See more
 Warner Music Group

References

Warner Music Group